Bolaji Ogunmola  is a Nigerian actress.

Personal life and education 
Ogunmola had her primary education at Philomena Nursery and Primary School in Ebute Metta, before going to Ibadan for her secondary school. She studied business management and entrepreneurship at the National Open University of Nigeria. Ogunmola is also an alumna of the University of Ilorin. She trained professionally as an actor at the Royal Arts Academy. Speaking to Vanguard on her relationship status, Ogunmola said, "I am single but not searching. I am independent and working hard to make money." She also said that money was a core ingredient in a successful relationship. In a 2016 interview, she said that even though she is more attracted to light-skinned men, she does not encourage bleaching of any form.

Career 
Ogunmola was a participant in the 2013 Next Movie Star reality show. Her role in Okon goes to School has been cited as the first film in which she appeared professionally.

On being given roles, due to her physique rather than her acting skills, Ogunmola explained that her feminine figure, body language, the charismatic movement, and acting talents were all subsets of the universal her, and if one is viewed as more pronounced than another, it does not make her less valuable as an actor. For her role in Sobi's Mystic, she was listed as one of the five most promising Nollywood actresses by The News Guru. In an interview with The Punch, she describes her double role as Aida/Mystic in the film as the most challenging in her career. She also highlighted Biodun Stephen, Mo Abudu , and Oprah Winfrey as persons to whom she looks up in the business of film-making.

She had two nominations at the 2018 City People Movie Awards. She is of the opinion that she has more focus on her craft and not stardom.

Selected filmography 
 Tough Love
 Sobi's Mystic
 All Shades of Wrong
 Okon Goes to School
 Tempted
 Outcast
 Out of Luck
 On Bended Knees
 Squatters (season 1)
 Lekki Wives (season 1)
 Jenifa's Diary (season 1)
 Living Next to YouProgressive Tailors ClubA Simple Lie''

Awards and nominations

See also 

 List of Nigerian actresses
 List of Yoruba people

References

External links 
 

Living people
University of Ilorin alumni
21st-century Nigerian actresses
Yoruba actresses
Nigerian film actresses
Nigerian television actresses
Year of birth missing (living people)
National Open University of Nigeria alumni